1977 Australian Open may refer to:
 1977 Australian Open (January)
 1977 Australian Open (December)